The 1993 Marlboro Masters of Formula 3 was the third Masters of Formula 3 race held at Circuit Zandvoort on 1 August 1993. It was won by Jos Verstappen, for Opel Team WTS.

Drivers and teams

Classification

Qualifying

Race

References

Masters of Formula Three
Masters of Formula Three
Masters of Formula Three
Masters of Formula Three